Bathybagrus is a genus of claroteid catfishes native to Africa where they are only found in Lake Tanganyika.

Species
There are currently six recognized species in this genus:
 Bathybagrus grandis (Boulenger, 1917) (Kukumai)
 Bathybagrus graueri (Steindachner, 1911)
 Bathybagrus platycephalus (Worthington & Ricardo, 1937)
 Bathybagrus sianenna (Boulenger, 1906)
 Bathybagrus stappersii (Boulenger, 1917)
 Bathybagrus tetranema R. M. Bailey & D. J. Stewart, 1984

References
 

Claroteidae

Catfish genera
Freshwater fish genera
Taxonomy articles created by Polbot